In enzymology, a carotene 7,8-desaturase is an enzyme that catalyzes the chemical reaction

neurosporene + AH2 + O2  lycopene + A + 2 H2O

The 3 substrates of this enzyme are neurosporene, an electron acceptor AH2, and O2, whereas its 3 products are lycopene, the reduction product A, and H2O.

This enzyme belongs to the family of oxidoreductases, specifically those acting on paired donors, with O2 as oxidant and incorporation or reduction of oxygen. The oxygen incorporated need not be derived from O miscellaneous.  The systematic name of this enzyme class is carotene, hydrogen-donor:oxygen oxidoreductase. This enzyme is also called zeta-carotene desaturase.  This enzyme participates in carotenoid biosynthesis - general.

References

 

EC 1.14.99
Enzymes of unknown structure